The National Museum of Marine Science and Technology (NMMST) is a museum of marine science and marine technology in Zhongzheng District, Keelung, Taiwan. It received 1,395,127 visits in 2016.

History

The museum building was originally constructed as the North Thermal Power Plant in 1937 by the Japanese government, the first power plant in Taiwan constructed on a reclaimed land. The power plant was decommissioned in 1981 and left abandoned. In 1990, the planning committee to establish the museum was set up, in which in 1997 the preparatory office was subsequently established as well. In 1999, the Executive Yuan approved the construction plan for the museum. In 2001, the plan to convert the former power plant into a museum was unveiled. The building was designated as a historical building in 2004 by Keelung City Government. The museum was opened by Premier Jiang Yi-huah on 26 January 2014.

Buildings

 Main Exhibition Building, Administration Center, Education Center and Archive and Research Center
 Marine Environment Gallery
 Marine Science Gallery
 Naval Architecture and Ocean Engineering Gallery
 Fishery Science Gallery
 People and the Sea Gallery
 Wonders of the Deep Sea Gallery
 Deep Sea Theater
 Kid's Exploration Zone
 Regional Exploration Gallery
 3D IMAX Marine Theater
 Rongxuan Park
 Chaojing Ocean Center and Coastal Ecology Exploration Park
 Coastal Recreation Park and Auxiliary Parking Lot

Access
The museum is accessible within walking distance north of Haikeguan Station of Taiwan Railways.

See also
 List of museums in Taiwan

References

External links

 
 National Museum of Marine Science and Technology

2014 establishments in Taiwan
Former power stations
Museums established in 2014
Museums in Keelung
Marine Science and Technology
Science museums in Taiwan